The 1973 Soviet First League was the third season of the Soviet First League and the 33rd season of the Soviet second tier league competition.

Final standings

Number of teams by union republic

See also
 Soviet First League

External links
 1973 season. RSSSF

1973
2
Soviet
Soviet